Khoune, formerly called Muang Khoun (Khoune) or Old Xiang Khouang is a district (muang) of Xiangkhouang province in north-central Laos. It is a ghost of its former self, 35 km southeast of Phonsavan, was once the royal seat of the minor kingdom of Muang Phuan, renowned in the sixteenth century for its 62 opulent stupas, whose sides were said to be covered in treasure. Years of bloody invasions by Thai and Vietnamese soldiers, pillaging by Chinese bandits in the nineteenth century and a monsoon of bombs that lasted nearly a decade during the Second Indochina War taxed this town so heavily that, by the time the air raids stopped, next to nothing was left of the kingdom's exquisite temples. The town is partly abandoned, and centuries of history were drawn to a close. All that remains of the kingdom's former glory is an elegant Buddha image towering over ruined columns of brick at Wat Phia Wat, and That Dam, both of which bear the scars of the events that ended Xieng Khuang's centuries of rich history. Although the town has been rebuilt and renamed, it has been supplanted by Phonsavan. In 1707, when the Kingdom of Lan Xang split into three separate kingdoms. Muang Phuan became a tributary state of the Kingdom of Luang Prabang.

Khoune district has four main ethnic groups: Lao, Hmong, Khmu, and O Du.

References

Districts of Xiangkhouang province